Jean de Castro (Liège, c. 1540 – 1611) was a Belgian composer. Although he has virtually been forgotten in the revival of renaissance music he was during his life second only to Lassus in his popularity according to the Antwerp printer-publisher Christophe Plantin.

Despite the Spanish-sounding name Castro was a local from Liège, referred to as "nostre Castro" by the poet Etienne de Walcourt. He worked in Antwerp in the 1570s and was maitre de chapelle to the Duke of Juliers, Liège, in 1580.

Works
 Chansons, odes, et sonetz de Pierre Ronsard 1576; performing edition Jeanice Brooks 1994

Recordings
 Chansons sur des poèmes de Ronsard: Ensemble Clément Janequin, Dominique Visse. Harmonia Mundi
 7 Motets (Decantabat populus Israel, Resurrexi et adhuc tecum sum, Afflictus sum, O sacrum convivum, Judica me Domine and Regina Coeli) on Musica Sacra in Colonia, Cologne Musica Fiata, La Capella Ducale, Roland Wilson.
 2000 - Jean de Castro: Polyphony in a European Perspective. Capilla Flamenca with More Maiorum, Piffaro, Trigon-Project, Wim Diepenhorst and Bart Demuyt. Passacaille 931.

References

External links
 Jean De Castro: Music and Music Patronage in the 16th Century (online exhibition)  The exhibition is part of a larger project to publish an opera omnia of De Castro's work.

Belgian composers
Male composers
Belgian male musicians
1540s births
1611 deaths
Prince-Bishopric of Liège musicians